General of Cavalry Friedrich Erhard Leopold von Röder (24 January 1768 – 7 December 1834) was a Prussian officer during the Napoleonic Wars, and from 1818 to 1819 president of the Schlesischen Gesellschaft für vaterländische Kultur ("Silesian Society for patriotic culture").

Notes

References

Further reading

1768 births
1834 deaths
Prussian Army personnel of the Napoleonic Wars
Generals of Cavalry (Prussia)